Kaolang Forest Park is a forest park in the Gambia. Established on January 1, 1954, it covers 2379 hectares.

It lies on both sides of the South Bank Road, Gambia's main trunk road, along the stretch between Soma and Brikama Ba.  The Kaolang Forest Park is about twelve kilometers before Brikama Ba and eight kilometers after Kundang.

References
  
 

Protected areas established in 1954
Forest parks of the Gambia